Gallivan is an unincorporated community in Cut Knife Rural Municipality No. 439, Saskatchewan, Canada. The community is located on Range Road 203 (Gallivan Road), about 15 km east of the town of Cut Knife. As of 2011, Gallivan's population was 0. Very little of Gallivan remains. In fact, only the Community Hall and United church still stand.

See also

 List of communities in Saskatchewan
 List of ghost towns in Saskatchewan
 List of Canadian tornadoes and tornado outbreaks

References

Cut Knife No. 439, Saskatchewan
Unincorporated communities in Saskatchewan
Ghost towns in Saskatchewan
Division No. 13, Saskatchewan